Allirahu Nature Reserve is a nature reserve which is located in Saare County, Estonia.

The area of the nature reserve is 1971 ha.

The protected area was founded in 2005 to protect valuable habitat types and threatened species on Allirahu.

References

Nature reserves in Estonia
Geography of Saare County